Three Early Stories is a posthumous publication of American author J. D. Salinger, published in 2014, comprising three stories: "The Young Folks", "Go See Eddie" and "Once a Week Won't Kill You".

These stories, as the title says, are three of his earliest stories he ever published, dating back as early as 1940. However, the stories weren't published in book format until 2014, the publication year of this collection. Both "The Young Folks" and "Once a Week Won't Kill You" were originally published in Story magazine, "The Young Folks" being published in 1940, making it Salinger's first published story, and "Once a Week Won't Kill You" in 1944. "Go See Eddie" was originally published in Kansas Review in the December 1940 issue, making it his second published story.

The collection also includes new illustrations, created by Anna Rose Yoken, to accompany the stories.

History 
In 2014, The Devault-Graves Agency made world literary news by publishing the first legitimate J.D. Salinger book in over 50 years, Three Early Stories. The book collected the first two short stories ever published by Salinger and a later one published during his World War II period. The agency discovered through research that those three Salinger stories, unbeknownst to the Salinger estate according to some reports, had fallen into the public domain. However, The Devault-Graves Agency applied for and received a copyright for the book as a unique anthology, thus protecting its Three Early Stories book from others publishing the three stories collectively.

Three Early Stories was also published in six foreign-language editions. The Devault-Graves Agency brought suit against the Salinger Trust for what they termed as interference with their foreign marketing of the book. The agency dropped the lawsuit when they felt that the Salinger Trust would no longer interfere with the book’s marketing in those countries where the copyright of Three Early Stories was upheld. The agency also claimed they would not try to market the book in countries where the Salinger Trust still held copyright to the three stories in question. The copyright issues involved in the case have caused it to become an important case in the area of international copyright law.

The Young Folks 
The Young Folks was Salinger's first published work, written in 1939 and given to Whit Burnett, later appearing in the March/April 1940 issue of Story magazine. It takes place at a New York cocktail party and details the emptiness of the conversation between a young woman and a male college student.

Go See Eddie 
Go See Eddie is one of J. D. Salinger's first short stories. It is a tense story about a brother and sister, first published in 1940. Initially submitted to Story magazine and then Esquire before being accepted by The University of Kansas City Review, now known as New Letters, this short story was forgotten for decades, before being uncovered in 1963 by Salinger's biographer Warren French. This story was republished in Fiction: Form & Experience (ed. William M. Jones, 1969) and it's now in the public domain.

Plot summary 
The story cast consists of two siblings Bobby and Helen, and their maid Elsie.  Bobby comes to see Helen who is grooming herself.  He tries to convince her of several things.  The first is to pursue a job with a friend of his (Eddie) and his second motive is to convince her to not commit adultery with a married man.  He complains of her promiscuity and the disagreement escalates.  After a brief fight, Bobby tells Helen about a rumour that she is seeing another man as well, which she denies, and the lunch he had with the wife of the man who is committing adultery with Helen.  After a last attempt at telling her to go see Eddie, Bobby leaves.  Helen reflects on what has transpired and starts to rectify the situation by possibly cancelling the affair. She then calls the other guy with whom she is rumoured to have an affair.

Once a Week Won't Kill You 
Published in the Nov/Dec 1944 edition of Story magazine, the story deals with the departure of a soldier for combat in Europe and the soldier's request that his wife spend more time with his aunt when he is gone. Salinger wrote this story when he was already in England.

References 

Short stories by J. D. Salinger
2014 short story collections